The 2002 NCAA Women's Water Polo Championship was the third annual tournament to determine the national championship of NCAA women's collegiate water polo. The single-elimination tournament was played at Canyonview Pool at the University of California, San Diego in La Jolla, San Diego, California from May 10–11, 2003.

UCLA, in a rematch of the previous two years' finals, defeated Stanford in the final, 4–3, to win their second NCAA championship. The Bruins (23–4) were coached by Adam Krikorian.

UCLA's Robin Beauregard was named the tournament's Most Outstanding Player. Five different players (2 from UCLA, 2 from Stanford, and 1 from Loyola Marymount) tied as the tournament's leading scorer, with 3 goals each.

Qualification
Since there has only ever been one single national championship for women's water polo, all NCAA women's water polo programs (whether from Division I, Division II, or Division III) were eligible. A total of 4 teams were invited to contest this championship.

Tournament bracket
Site: Canyonview Pool, La Jolla, San Diego, California

All tournament teams

First Team
Robin Beauregard, UCLA (Most Outstanding Player)
Natalie Golda, UCLA
Jessica López, UCLA
Jackie Frank, Stanford
Julie Gardner, Stanford
Hannah Luber, Stanford
Kelty Luber, Stanford
Brenda Villa, Stanford
Katie Hicks, Loyola Marymount
Krista Peterson, Indiana

Second Team
Maureen Flanagan, UCLA
Jamie Hipp, UCLA
Kelly Rulon, UCLA
Teresa Guidi, Loyola Marymount
Devon Wright, Loyola Marymount
Kristin Stanford, Indiana

See also 
Pre-NCAA Intercollegiate Women's Water Polo Champions (pre-2001)
 NCAA Men's Water Polo Championship

References

2003 in American sports
2003 in water polo
2003 in sports in California
May 2003 sports events in the United States
2003